CSTNET or China Science and Technology Network offers Internet services to the Chinese education, research, scientific and technical communities, relevant government departments and hi-tech enterprises, providing services such as network access, host trusteeship, virtual host and domain name registration etc. On April 20, 1994, CSTNET launched the first national formal Internet link and this became the earliest direct global connected Internet in the country.

See also
 CERNET
 National research and education network
 China Next Generation Internet
 ChinaNet

External links
 Official website 

Education in China
Internet in China
National research and education networks
Science and technology in China
Telecommunications in China